Dowlatabad-e Ansari (also Romanized as Dowlatābād-e Anşārī; also known as Dowlatābād) is a village in Rud Ab-e Gharbi Rural District, Rud Ab District, Narmashir County, Kerman Province, Iran. At the 2006 census, its population was 1,321, in 316 families.

References 

Populated places in Narmashir County